LA-20 is a constituency of Azad Kashmir Legislative Assembly which is currently represented by the Sardar Muhammad Sagheer Chugtai of All Jammu and Kashmir Muslim Conference. It covers the area of Thorar in Poonch District of Azad Kashmir, Pakistan.

Election 2016

elections were held in this constituency on 21 July 2016.

References

Azad Kashmir Legislative Assembly constituencies
Poonch District, Pakistan